Jessica Antonella Santacruz Cáceres (born 22 January 1990) is a Paraguayan footballer who plays for Austrian club FC Wacker Innsbruck. She has been a member of the Paraguay women's national team.

International career
Santacruz played for Paraguay at senior level in two Copa América Femenina editions (2010 and 2014).

References

1990 births
Living people
Women's association football central defenders
Paraguayan women's footballers
Paraguay women's international footballers
Friends University alumni
Cerro Porteño players
Club Sol de América footballers
Paraguayan expatriate women's footballers
Paraguayan expatriate sportspeople in the United States
Expatriate women's soccer players in the United States
21st-century Paraguayan women
20th-century Paraguayan women